Felix A. Pappalardi Jr. (December 30, 1939 – April 17, 1983) was an American music producer, songwriter, vocalist, and bassist. He is best known as the bassist and co-lead vocalist of the band Mountain, whose song "Mississippi Queen" peaked at number 21 on the Billboard Hot 100 and has become a classic rock radio staple.  Originating in the eclectic music scene in New York's Greenwich Village, he became closely attached to the British power trio Cream, writing, arranging, and producing for their second album Disraeli Gears.  As a producer for Atlantic Records, he worked on several projects with guitarist Leslie West; in 1969 their partnership evolved into the band Mountain.  The band lasted less than five years, but their work influenced the first generation of heavy metal and hard rock music.  Pappalardi continued to work as a producer, session musician, and songwriter until he was shot and killed by his wife Gail Collins in 1983.

Early life 
Pappalardi was born in the Bronx, New York City.  A classically trained musician, he graduated from New York City's The High School of Music & Art and attended the University of Michigan.

Career 
In 1964, Pappalardi was a member of Max Morath's Original Rag Quartet (ORQ) in their premier engagement at New York's Village Vanguard with several other musicians. Along with Pappalardi on guitarrón (Mexican acoustic bass) were pianist-singer Morath, who revived classic ragtime played in the Scott Joplin manner, Barry Kornfeld, a New York studio folk and jazz guitarist, and Jim Tyler, a Baroque and Renaissance lutenist, playing four-string banjo and mandolin. The ORQ then toured the college and concert circuit during the following year, and opened four engagements with the Dinah Shore show in Las Vegas and elsewhere. Pappalardi studied classical music at the University of Michigan. Upon completing his studies and returning to New York, he was unable to find work and so became part of the Greenwich Village folk-music scene where he made a name for himself as a skilled arranger; he also appeared on albums by Tom Paxton as well as Vince Martin and Fred Neil for Elektra Records. From there he moved into record production, initially concentrating on folk and folk-rock acts for artists such as The Youngbloods and Joan Baez.

As a producer, Pappalardi is perhaps best known for his work with Cream, beginning with their second album, Disraeli Gears. He contributed instrumentation for his studio arrangements and he and his wife, Gail Collins, wrote the Cream hit "Strange Brew" with Eric Clapton. He also produced The Youngbloods' first album.

As a musician, Pappalardi is widely recognized as a bassist, vocalist, and founding member of the American hard rock band (and heavy metal forerunner) Mountain, a band born out of his working with future bandmate Leslie West's soul-inspired rock and roll band The Vagrants, and producing West's 1969 Mountain solo album. The band's original incarnation actively recorded and toured between 1969 and 1971. Pappalardi produced the band's albums, and co-wrote and arranged a number of the band's songs with Collins and West.

The band's signature song "Mississippi Queen" is still heard regularly on classic rock radio stations. They also had a hit with the song "Nantucket Sleighride" written by Pappalardi and Collins.

Pappalardi generally played Gibson basses on Mountain's live and studio recordings. He was most often seen with an EB-1 violin bass but there are also photographs of him playing an EB-0 live (likely because they had the same pickup configuration and scale length). Pappalardi obtained his sound by playing Gibson basses with a single Humbucker in the neck through a set of Sunn amplifiers that, he claimed, once belonged to Jimi Hendrix.

Later life and death 

Pappalardi was forced to retire because of partial deafness, ostensibly from his high-volume shows with Mountain. He continued producing throughout the 1970s, released a solo album (Don't Worry, Ma) and recorded with Kazuo Takeda's band Creation (who had opened for a reunited Mountain during their 1973 tour of Japan).

In May 1973, the British music magazine NME reported that Pappalardi would be producing and playing bass on Queen of the Night, the debut album for Maggie Bell, former singer of Stone the Crows, but this proved to be false.

He also worked on the NBC show Hot Hero Sandwich in 1979.

Pappalardi was shot and killed by his wife, Gail Collins Pappalardi, on April 17, 1983, in their apartment on the East Side of Manhattan, with a derringer he had given her as a gift a few months previously. She was subsequently charged with second-degree murder and was found guilty of the lesser criminally negligent homicide.

He is interred next to his mother at Woodlawn Cemetery in the Bronx, New York City.

Selected discography 
For his work with Mountain, see their page.
1976: Creation (in collaboration with the Japanese rock band of the same name)
1979: Don't Worry, Ma

As producer 
1967: The Youngbloods – The Youngbloods
1967: Cream – Disraeli Gears
1967: Hamilton Camp – Here's to You
1968: Bo Grumpus – Before the War
1968: Kensington Market – Avenue Road
1968: Cream – Wheels of Fire
1969: Cream – Goodbye
1969: Kensington Market – Aardvark
1969: Leslie West – Mountain
1969: Jack Bruce – Songs for a Tailor
1969: Jolliver Arkansaw – Home
1969: David Rea – Maverick Child
1970: Mountain – Climbing!
1971: Mylon LeFevre, Mylon with Holy Smoke, Columbia C31085
1971: Mountain – Nantucket Sleighride
1971: Mountain – Flowers of Evil
1972: Mountain – Mountain Live: The Road Goes Ever On
1973: Bedlam
1974: Mountain – Twin Peaks
1974: Mountain – Avalanche
1974: Back Door – 8th St Nites
1975: Busta Cherry Jones & Donald Kinsey White Lightnin'''
1975: The Flock – Inside Out1976: Natural Gas – Natural Gas1977: Gasolin' – Killin' Time1977: Jesse Colin Young – Love on the Wing1978: The Dead Boys – We Have Come for Your Children1978: Hot Tuna – Double Dose1981: Kicks – Kicks featuring Marge Raymond – Recorded at RPM Studios, New York
1982: George Flowers & Gary Byrd – The Day That Football Died Other appearances and contributions 
1963: Vince Martin and Fred Neil – Tear Down the Walls – guitarrón and backing vocals
1964: Tom Paxton – Ramblin' Boy – guitarrón
1965: Tom Paxton – Ain't That News!  – guitarrón
1966: Buffy Sainte-Marie – Little Wheel Spin and Spin – credited as "instrumental ensemble arranger and conductor" on "Timeless Love"
1966: Ian and Sylvia – Play One More – bass
1966: Ian and Sylvia – The French Girl – credited as "arr. and conducted"
1966: Ian and Sylvia – When I Was A Cowboy – bass
1966: Ian and Sylvia – Short Grass – bass
1966: Ian and Sylvia – Lonely Girls – bass
1967:  Devil's Anvil – Hard Rock From the Middle East – bass, guitar, tambura, percussion and vocals, credited as "arranger and musical director"
1967: Richie Havens – Morning, Morning – credited as  "arranger'
1967: Jackie Washington [Landrón] – Morning Song – credited as "backup ensemble conductor'
1968: Bo Grumpus – Before the War – keyboards, trumpet, bass, guitar, percussion, ocarina
1968: Kensington Market – Avenue Road – vocals on "Aunt Violet's Knee"
1969: Kensington Market – Aardvark – bass, piano, trumpet, organ
1969: Jolliver Arkansaw – Home – keyboards, guitar, ocarina and bass on "Hatred Sun"
1970: Ian and Sylvia – Greatest Hits – bass
1970: Fred Neil – Little Bit of Rain – bass
1971: John Sebastian – The Four of Us – bass on "Apple Hill"
1971: Richard & Mimi Fariña – The Best of Richard & Mimi Fariña – bass
1973: Bedlam – Bedlam – keyboards, credited as songwriter on "Looking Through Love's Eyes (Busy Dreamin')"
1973: Eddie Mottau – No Turning Around – Mellotron, organ, ocarina and trumpet on "Circus Tent" and "Waitin' Out The Winter"
1975: The Flock – Inside Out – backing vocals on "Straight Home"
1977: Jesse Colin Young – Love on the Wing'' – backing vocals and string arrangements on "Drift Away" and "Fool", horn arrangements on "Louisiana Highway"
1981: Kicks – "Kicks featuring Marge Raymond" – backing vocals on "Raceway" and "All Over Again" along with Steven Tyler

References 

1939 births
1983 deaths
Musicians from the Bronx
Record producers from New York (state)
American rock bass guitarists
American male bass guitarists
American rock musicians
American people of Italian descent
University of Michigan alumni
Deaths by firearm in Manhattan
Cream (band)
Mountain (band) members
20th-century American musicians
20th-century English musicians
American male guitarists
The High School of Music & Art alumni
Mariticides
Burials at Woodlawn Cemetery (Bronx, New York)
20th-century American bass guitarists
People murdered in New York City
Male murder victims
20th-century American male musicians